DN21 is a national road in Romania which that crosses the Bărăgan Plain, linking the Danube port of Brăila with Călărași. The road crosses the A2 motorway near Drajna, between the cities of Slobozia and Călărași. It underwent in major repairs between 2006 and 2007 on the  section between Drajna and Călărași.

References

Roads in Romania